Takapu or Tākapu is:
The New Zealand name for the Australasian gannet (Morus serrator), a seabird.
HMNZS Takapu, a patrol vessel of the Royal New Zealand Navy
Takapu Road in Wellington, New Zealand, is the location of Takapu Road Railway Station and Takapu Valley.